The Gordon Cup is an annual conference tournament held within the Gordon Conference in New Jersey Ice Hockey League. The inaugural Gordon Cup tournament took place in 1959, with Livingston winning the championship. The Cup recently celebrated its 50th anniversary.

Bergen Catholic, Bishop Eustace Prep, Christian Brothers Academy, Delbarton, and Seton Hall Prep participate in the Gordon Conference American Division. Don Bosco Prep, Gloucester Catholic, Pope John, St. Augustine Prep, and St. Peters Prep take part in the Gordon Conference National Division.

Gordon Cup Championship

References

Ice hockey competitions in the United States